John Warden (1841–1906) was a Union Army soldier during the American Civil War.

John Warden may also refer to:

 John A. Warden III (born 1943), retired colonel in the United States Air Force
 John Warden (MP) (died 1628), English politician
 John Warden (footballer) (born 1951), Australian rules footballer

See also
 Jon Warden (born 1946), American Major League Baseball pitcher
 John Lorimer Worden (1818-1897), United States Navy rear admiral